Wanzo is a surname. Notable people with the surname include:

 Rebecca Wanzo (born 1975), American academic
 Mel Wanzo (1930–2005), American trombonist